Long Island is an unincorporated community in  Campbell County, Virginia, United States. Long Island is located along the Roanoke River (also known as the Staunton River) east-southeast of Altavista.

The main road through the community is Virginia Secondary Route 761 (Long Island Road), and the community is almost entirely agricultural. A former Norfolk and Western Railway line runs through the community on the northeast bank of the Staunton River. A boat ramp exists south of VSR 761.

Green Hill was listed on the National Register of Historic Places in 1969.

References

Unincorporated communities in Campbell County, Virginia
Unincorporated communities in Virginia